Régis Simon (born 19 March 1958, in Troyes) is a French former professional road bicycle racer. He is the brother of former professional cyclists François, Pascal and Jérôme Simon. Régis Simon won a stage in the 1985 Tour de France.

Major results

1985
Le Horps
Tour de France:
Winner stage 18B
1987
Dixmont
1990
Circuit de Lorraine

External links 

Official Tour de France results for Régis Simon

French male cyclists
1958 births
Living people
French Tour de France stage winners
Sportspeople from Troyes
Cyclists from Grand Est